Dowlais Cae Harris railway station served the village of Dowlais, Glamorgan, Wales, from 1867 to 1964 on the Rhymney Railway.

History 
The station opened on 1 February 1867 by the Rhymney Railway. It was situated behind Antelope Hotel, which is still extant today. The station closed on 15 June 1964.

References

External links 

Railway stations in Great Britain opened in 1867
Railway stations in Great Britain closed in 1964
1867 establishments in Wales
1964 disestablishments in Wales
Former Rhymney Railway stations